When the Haar Rolls In is the fourth studio album by James Yorkston. The haar in the title is also a metaphor for depression.

Released on 1 September 2008 in the UK, the album was available on double 10" vinyl, CD, and a limited edition discbox set which features the original album in CD and 10" vinyl format, a disc of remixes of Yorkston's songs and a disc of covers of Yorkston's songs.

Norma Waterson, Mike Waterson and Marry Waterson feature on the album.

Track listing 
"B's Jig"
"Tortoise Regrets Hare"
"Temptation"
"When the Haar Rolls In"
"Queen of Spain"
"Midnight Feast"
"Would You Have Me Born with Wooden Eyes?"
"Summer's Not the Same Without You"
"The Capture of the Horse"

Covers disc
"The Lang Toun" - Rozi Plain
"In Your Hands" - Pictish Trail & HMS Ginafore
"St. Patrick" - David Thomas Broughton
"Are You Coming Home Tonight?" - Suzy Mangion
"Us Late Travellers" - Charlotte Greig
"Shipwreckers" - Adrian Crowley
"Sweet Jesus" - Nancy Elizabeth
"Tender to the Blues" - Cathal Coughlan
"Summer Song" - U.N.P.O.C.
"Tortoise Regrets Hare" - King Creosote
"Banjo # 2" - John Smith
"Would You Have Me Born with Wooden Eyes?" - Archie Bronson Outfit
"Banjo # 1" - Doogie Paul and the Athletes
"Steady as She Goes" - Viking Moses
"Sail On" - James Yorkston
"Heron" - Jon Hopkins

Remixes disc
"I Know My Love" - James Yorkston's Remix
"Summer Song" - Dolphin Boy Remix
"Woozy with Cider" - King Biscuit Time Remix
"The River Just Beyond" - On The Fly Remix
"The Capture Of The Horse" - James Yorkston's Remix
"Orgiva Song" - On The Fly Remix
"The Brussels Rambler" - Reuben Taylor's Remix
"Would You Have Me Born with Wooden Eyes?" - Chicken Feed Remix
"When the Haar Rolls In" - King Creosote Remix
"Tortoise Regrets Hare" - Down The Tiny Steps Remix
"The Lang Toun" - Four Tet Remix
"St. Patrick" - James Yorkston's Remix

Musicians
 James Yorkston - Vocals (1-9), Guitar (1-9), Banjo (1,2,4,6,8,9), Clarinet (1,4,9), Xylophone (2), Bouzouki (3,7-9), Percussion (4), Noises (4), Harmonium (4), Psaltery (6), Concertina (6,9), Mandolin (7-9), Vibraphone (7,8), Rhodes (9), Violin (9)
 Jon Bews - Violin (9)
 Nancy Elizabeth - Harp (1), Vocals (9)
 Marry Gilhooly - Vocals (6)
 Olly Knight - Electric Guitar (6)
 Walter Dexter O'Driscoll - Prepared Piano (4)
 Doogie Paul - Contrabass (1,3-9), Electric Bass (2), Guitar (2), Vocals (3,5,6,8), Vibraphone (6)
 Faisal Rahman - Percussion (1-4,6,7,9)
 Sarah Scutt - Clarinet (2,3,6-8), Vocals (7)
 Emma Smith - Violin (1-3,5-7), Vocals (5,8)
 Reuben Taylor - Piano (1-7), Accordion (1,3,4,7), Harpsichord (1,3), Vibraphone (1,6,9), Concertina (2), Rhodes (2,3), Hammond Organ (4), Timpani (4), Noises (4), Contrabass (6), Vocals (6), Wine Glass (6), Harmonium (7)
 Mike Waterson - Vocals (6)
 Norma Waterson - Vocals (6)

External links
Domino Records minisite

2008 albums
Domino Recording Company albums
James Yorkston albums